James McGowan (1841 – 7 May 1912) was a New Zealand politician of the Liberal Party.

Biography
McGowan was born in Maxwell's Court, County Down, Ireland, in 1841. He emigrated to Auckland in 1865 on the ship Liverpool. After five years, he moved to Thames, where he had a large store and a bakery.

Political career

He was Mayor of Thames in 1889, and in 1892–1893.

He represented the Thames electorate in Parliament from an 1893 by-election. The by-election was caused after the resignation of Liberal Party MP Alfred Cadman. The Liberals selected the incumbent Mayor of Thames, James McGowan as their candidate for Cadman's seat. After a large public gathering, it was decided not to run another candidate against McGowan in light of a general election being only months away, resulting in McGowan being elected unopposed.

From 1896 until 1900 he was the Liberal Party's junior whip.

He was Minister of Justice and Minister of Mines from 23 January 1900 in the Liberal Government. From 6 August 1906, he was Minister of Immigration. From 23 November 1906, he was Minister of Industries and Commerce. He held all ministerial posts until his resignation from the lower house.

He resigned on 6 January 1909 so that he could be appointed to the Legislative Council on that same day, where he served until his death.

Notes

References

 

|-

|-

1841 births
1912 deaths
New Zealand Liberal Party MPs
Members of the Cabinet of New Zealand
Members of the New Zealand Legislative Council
New Zealand Liberal Party MLCs
Mayors of Thames
Unsuccessful candidates in the 1887 New Zealand general election
19th-century New Zealand politicians
Justice ministers of New Zealand